Trevor John Ikaikaloa Larnach (born February 26, 1997) is an American professional baseball outfielder for the Minnesota Twins of Major League Baseball (MLB). He made his MLB debut in 2021.

Amateur career
Larnach attended College Park High School in Pleasant Hill, California, and was drafted by the San Diego Padres in the 40th round of the 2015 Major League Baseball Draft. He did not sign with the Padres and attended Oregon State University where he played college baseball for the Beavers.

As a freshman at Oregon State in 2016, Larnach played in 28 games, hitting .157/.271/.176 with three runs batted in (RBI) over 51 at bats. As a sophomore in 2017, he played in 60 games and hit .303/.421/.429 with three home runs and 48 RBI in 198 at bats. After the 2016 and 2017 seasons, he played collegiate summer baseball with the Falmouth Commodores of the Cape Cod Baseball League, where he was named a league all-star in 2016.

In 2018, as a junior, Larnach was named to the Pac-12 All-Conference Team. During Game 2 of the 2018 College World Series against the Arkansas Razorbacks, with Arkansas and OSU tied 3-3 in the top of the ninth inning, Larnach hit a two out, two-run home run to give the Beavers a 5-3 lead. Oregon State went on to win the game and the 2018 College World Series. He was named to the All-Tournament Team. Larnach finished his junior season with a .348 batting average, 19 home runs, and 77 RBIs.

Professional career
The Minnesota Twins selected Larnach in the first round, with the 20th overall selection, in the 2018 Major League Baseball draft. He signed with the Twins on July 5 for a $2.55 million signing bonus. He made his professional debut with the Elizabethton Twins of the Rookie-level Appalachian League and was promoted to the Cedar Rapids Kernels of the Class A Midwest League in August. In 42 games between the two teams, he slashed .303/.390/.500 with five home runs and 26 RBIs.

Larnach began 2019 with the Fort Myers Miracle of the Class A-Advanced Florida State League, earning FSL All-Star honors. He was promoted to the Pensacola Blue Wahoos in July. Over 127 games between the two clubs, Larnach batted .309 with 13 home runs and 66 RBIs. Larnach did not play in a game in 2020 due to the cancellation of the minor league season because of the COVID-19 pandemic.

On May 7, 2021, Larnach was selected to the 40-man roster and promoted to the major leagues for the first time. Larnach made his MLB debut the next day as the starting left fielder against the Detroit Tigers. The Twins optioned Larnach to Triple-A St. Paul on August 16, 2021.

Personal life
Larnach is of Hawaiian descent. His maternal uncle, Brian Cabral, played nine years in the National Football League.

References

External links

Oregon State Beavers bio

1997 births
All-American college baseball players
American people of Native Hawaiian descent
Baseball players from California
Cedar Rapids Kernels players
Elizabethton Twins players
Falmouth Commodores players
Fort Myers Miracle players
Living people
Major League Baseball outfielders
Minnesota Twins players
Native Hawaiian sportspeople
People from Pleasant Hill, California
Oregon State Beavers baseball players
Pensacola Blue Wahoos players
St. Paul Saints players